Coleostachys is a genus in the Malpighiaceae, a family of about 75 genera of flowering plants in the order Malpighiales. Coleostachys contains only one species (Coleostachys genipifolia) of shrubs or treelets found in wet forests of the Amazonian lowlands of French Guiana and adjacent Brazil.

External links
Malpighiaceae Malpighiaceae - description, taxonomy, phylogeny, and nomenclature
Coleostachys

Malpighiaceae
Malpighiaceae genera
Monotypic Malpighiales genera